Daisy Avellana (January 26, 1917 – May 12, 2013) was a Filipino stage actress and theater director. Avellana was honored as a National Artist of the Philippines for Theater and Film in 1999.

Avellana was born Daisy Hontiveros on January 26, 1917, in Capiz, Capiz, (now Roxas City). Her husband was Lamberto Avellana, a film and stage director who was also named a National Artist in 1976. Daisy and Lamberto Avellana co-founded the Barangay Theater Guild (BTG), together with forty-eight colleagues, in 1939.

Avellana was one of the first graduates of the UST Graduate School with Master of Arts (MA) in English.

Avellana died on May 11, 2013, at the age of 96.

References

1917 births
2013 deaths
National Artists of the Philippines
Filipino stage actresses
People from Capiz
Visayan people